Government College, Nalwa is a public funded college located on Hisar-Tosham road in Nalwa village, 27 km from Hisar city of Hisar district, in the Indian state of Haryana. College is NAAC Accredited with B Grade.

According to the data maintained by the Government of India's Department of Statistics, the Government College, Nalwa was established in 1980 by Sh. Sita Ram, President of Jindal Trust.

Courses
The college offers the following three courses:
B.A.
B.Sc. (Non medical)
B. Com.

Departments
Department of Hindi
Department of History
Department of Economics
Department of Mathematics
Department of Psychology
Department of commerce
Department of Geography
Department of Political Science
Department OF Computer Science
Department of Sanskrit

See also 
 Government Girl's High school (former co-ed Govt school)
 Government Senior Secondary Government school for Boys
 List of Universities and Colleges in Hisar
 List of schools in Hisar
 List of institutions of higher education in Haryana

External links 
  Official website

References

Education in Hisar district
Universities and colleges in Haryana